North Lake is a freshwater lake in the suburb of North Lake, located  south of the central business district of Perth, the capital of Western Australia, and  from the Indian Ocean. The suburb and lake are located within the City of Cockburn local government area.

It is part of the northernmost lake within a chain of lakes which make up the Beeliar Regional Park (North Lake, Bibra Lake, South Lake, Booragoon Lake, Yangebup Lake, and Thomsons Lake). The lake has been known by this name since 1877, and the name was approved for the suburb in 1954.

See also

 List of lakes of Western Australia

References

Lakes of Perth, Western Australia
Beeliar Regional Park